Orlando City Soccer Club was an American professional soccer team based in Orlando, Florida, United States, that was the precursor to Orlando City SC. The team played in USL Pro, the third tier of the American soccer pyramid from 2010 to 2014, until discontinuing in favor of Orlando's entry to Major League Soccer (MLS), as an expansion franchise in 2015, by the same ownership group.

The team was founded in 2008 as the Austin Aztex FC before relocating to Orlando, Florida. It was one of the more successful lower-division teams in the United States in its stint in the USL. The team played its home games at the ESPN Wide World of Sports Complex for the 2014 season, after playing at Florida Citrus Bowl Stadium for three years. The team's colors were red, purple, gold and white. Its head coach was Adrian Heath.

In 2013, the team's ownership announced that their MLS expansion bid had been accepted, and that the team would join MLS in 2015 as the league's 21st franchise. The subsequent folding of Chivas USA resulted in Orlando City becoming the league's 20th franchise. At that time, the USL Pro franchise rights were transferred to Louisville City FC.

Ownership

The club's majority owner is Flavio Augusto da Silva. Da Silva, founder of the Wise Up ESL program, joined the club's ownership group on February 17, 2013. After the club's successful expansion bid into Major League Soccer, da Silva became the club's majority owner.

There are many other individuals in the ownership group, including Phil Rawlins, the club's President; John Bonner, the club's chairman; and Brendan Flood, a board member of English Premier League club Burnley.

History

Formation
The ownership group was announced on March 4, 2010, as Orlando Pro Soccer. It was affiliated with the Orlando Titans National Lacrosse League team. However, the Titans ran into financial difficulties. Steve Donner left the Titans club after the 2010 NLL season to focus on the soccer effort. In October 2010, the Orlando Pro Soccer USL rights were purchased by Phil Rawlins, a board member of English Premier League club Stoke City, who moved the Austin Aztex organization to Orlando. The team was announced on October 25, 2010. Rawlins stated at the press conference that he intends to bring a Major League Soccer franchise to Orlando "within 3–5 years", and intends to bring international matches to the city. Rawlins announced that the Aztex organization would remain intact in Orlando, Adrian Heath would be retained as manager, and most of the team's players would return. On January 23, 2013, Orlando City signed a two-year deal to be the official USL Pro affiliate of Sporting Kansas City.

Inaugural season

Orlando City's first preseason began with three matches against Major League Soccer teams. They also faced BK Häcken of the Swedish Allsvenskan before a series of matches against local colleges Rollins, UCF, Stetson and USF. They opened their first season on April 2, 2011, at Richmond, and played their first home game on April 9 against F.C. New York. They finished the regular season top of the American Division on 51 points, which resulted in the USL Pro Regular Season title. On September 3, they played the Harrisburg City Islanders in the 2011 USL Pro Championship. This match ended in a 1–1 draw, and after extra time the score was still tied at 2–2. Orlando went on to win 3–2 in penalty kicks making them the 2011 USL Pro champions.

2012 season

In 2012, Orlando City repeated as Regular Season champions, but exited the playoffs in the semifinals with a 4–3 loss to Wilmington Hammerheads.

2013 season

In their third year in USL Pro, the Lions took second place in the regular season. Their first game in the playoffs was a 5–0 win against the Pittsburgh Riverhounds. The semi-finals were a 3–2 win over the defending champions, the Charleston Battery. The result in the finals was a 7–4 win over the Charlotte Eagles. This marked Orlando City's second championship in 3 years.

2014 season

The fourth year in the USL Pro was its last in the league. In the preseason they competed in the 2014 Walt Disney World Pro Soccer Classic, taking 2nd in their group with 3 draws and drawing in the 3rd place match against the New York Red Bulls. By finishing the season 19–5–4, Orlando City won its 3rd Commissioner's Cup.

Transition to Major League Soccer 

On October 25, 2010, Phil Rawlins and his investor group of the club, announced their intentions of joining Major League Soccer within the next 3 to 5 years. On February 28, 2011, Orlando City announced it met with commissioner Don Garber and league officials concerning expansion. Topics covered included the demographics of the Orlando marketplace, the local corporate and fan support for soccer, and developing a roadmap for a future MLS franchise in Orlando. Orlando City team officials met with Commissioner Garber again on November 10, 2011 for further discussions about joining MLS as its 20th club – which went to New York City FC – in 2013.

On March 1, 2012,  Garber visited Orlando to meet with city and county officials. He stated, “It’s not a matter of if, but when,” while addressing Orlando’s chances of joining MLS.
On August 31, 2012, Rawlins told the Orlando Business Journal the team could get Major League Soccer approval as early as fall 2013, and be ready to play in the league by 2014 or 2015.  Rawlins said to make that happen, the league had asked the team to explore building a 22,000-seat soccer-specific stadium. “They didn’t say we had to have a stadium built before we could join, but they at least would like a plan that it’s happening.”

The team's ownership continued to work on a Major League Soccer expansion bid for several years. On November 19, 2013, they announced that their bid had been accepted by MLS and were awarded an expansion franchise to begin play in the 2015 MLS season. The Brazilian legend Kaká became a Designated Player for the team for the 2015 MLS season.

Orlando City's USL Pro license was acquired by minority owner Wayne Estopinal in June 2014. Estopinal moved the USL Pro team to Louisville, Kentucky, for the 2015 season, becoming Louisville City FC. The team became Orlando City's USL Pro affiliate, with James O'Connor becoming that club's manager.

Colors and badge

The logo was unveiled during local morning news on Orlando TV station WOFL at 7:00am EST on December 16, 2010, and was launched at 10:00am with the team's website.

The club adopted the nickname "Lions" from previous uses of the nickname in Orlando, particularly the Orlando Lions. The colors were shades of red, purple and gold, and are the same colors used by Italian Serie A club ACF Fiorentina (which is not involved with Orlando City). The colors used represent pride in city and team.

The branding was developed by Dixon Minear Design Marketing, the same firm that created the original branding for the Orlando Magic.

Their home uniform, white shirt with red shoulders and solid white shorts, was unveiled at their inaugural home friendly, and used without a sponsor through the 2011 Walt Disney World Pro Soccer Classic. Their away outfit consisted of a red shirt with white armpits and solid red shorts. At the home uniform unveiling, they also announced Orlando Health as their uniform sponsor. Their uniform brand was Lotto.

Stadium and attendance

  Orlando Citrus Bowl Stadium; Orlando, Florida (2011–2013)
  Hess Sports Fields; Lake Buena Vista, Florida (2014)

Orlando City played its games at the 70,000 seat Florida Citrus Bowl Stadium, located in Orlando, Florida. The club's 2012 season drew an average of over 6,900 fans per match, the highest average in the league. On February 15, 2013, the team announced that Fifth Third Bank had purchased naming rights for the stadium for Orlando City matches.

Due to the Citrus Bowl refurbishments, the team played the 2014 season at ESPN Wide World of Sports Complex. In 2014 the club had its lowest average attendance, 4,657 people a game up to July.

Highest Orlando City S.C. Attendance
 20,886 – September 2013, USL PRO Championship match v. Charlotte Eagles
 11,220 – 2011, USL PRO Championship match
 11,127 – June 23, 2013, friendly against Fluminense (Brazil) 
 10,889 – July 2011, friendly against Newcastle (England)

Record

This is a complete list of seasons for the USL franchise. For a season-by-season history including the successor Orlando City SC MLS franchise, see List of Orlando City SC seasons.

Developmental system
From the advent of Orlando Pro Soccer, the team allied with the Central Florida Kraze of the USL Premier Development League to assist player development. Following its successful first season, Orlando City acquired a controlling interest in the Kraze, and renamed them Orlando City U-23. The team has a legacy that includes several current and past Major League Soccer players and won the PDL Championship in 2004.

Also after their 2011 season, Orlando City acquired a controlling interest in the Florida Soccer Alliance youth soccer club, renaming them Orlando City Youth Soccer Club. That club has several teams competing in the USL Super Y-League.

Club culture
The club has two major active supporters groups:

The Ruckus is the oldest of these groups, whose basis was formed in 2009 as the "Orlando Soccer Supporters Club" without an affiliation to any particular soccer team. They occupy section 120.
The Iron Lion Firm, which separated from The Ruckus prior to the start of City's first season, occupies section 121.  Another group, The 407, was merged into the Iron Lion Firm prior to the start of the 2014 season.
The Orlando Natural Riddim Section is a Trinidadian drum band that occupies section 109 and plays drums and other percussion instruments throughout home matches.

The team also has several smaller groups that represent themselves at home games. These include the Space Coast Alliance, which involves the father of player Dennis Chin.

Controversies

When the club moved into ESPN's Wide World of Sports Complex, the supporters were criticized for the obscene language used in some of their chants.

On July 6, 2014, four Orlando City supporters were arrested following an altercation at Al Lang Field in St. Petersburg during a game against the Tampa Bay Rowdies in which fans were assaulted and illegal fireworks were used after members from both supporters groups had hidden themselves in the crowd.  One of the arrested had previously identified himself as a co-president of the Iron Lion Firm.  In response, the club "indefinitely suspended" both the Ruckus and Iron Lion Firm, pending their agreement to a new Fan Code of Conduct.

One week after the St. Petersburg incident, members of the Iron Lion Firm were ejected from a home game after profane language was chanted in their section.  The majority of the remaining Firm members walked out before the end of the game.

The Ruckus was reinstated on July 21, 2014, after agreeing to abide by a new Code of Conduct.  Weeks later the club reinstated the Iron Lion Firm as a recognized supporter's group as well.

Broadcasting
Orlando City aired several games locally on Bright House Sports Network (now Spectrum Sports Florida) with Jeff Radcliffe handling the play-by-play and Edmundo Rodriguez providing color commentary. Two regular season home games also appeared nationally on FOX Soccer Channel as part of USL Pro's broadcasting contract. All home games and many away games are broadcast online via USL Live. When BHSN also airs the match, their feed is used for the USL Live feed.

The team's weekly radio program, "OCS Live", airs on WYGM "740 the Game" every Tuesday night during the season, and is hosted by team communications director Adam Soucie.

Club news and player interviews can also be heard on the "Orlando City Soccercast." A podcast hosted by Dan Dennis and Tom Vann.

Their May 14, 2011, home match was broadcast on radio in Spanish by WIWA "VIVA 1160". The match was used as a "test broadcast"; it is unknown if they will air further games.

During 2012, several matches were aired on radio on WYGM, as well as on WWFL 1340 "Onda Mexicana Radio" in Spanish.

Players and staff

Final roster
As of July 19, 2014. Players in bold moved to the Orlando City MLS expansion team, or their USL affiliate, Louisville City FC.

Staff
  Adrian Heath – Head Coach
  Ian Fuller – Assistant Coach
  James O'Connor – Assistant Coach
  Marcos Machado – Goalkeeper Coach

Notable former players

  Yordany Álvarez
  Jean Alexandre
  Devorn Jorsling
  Dom Dwyer
  Lewis Neal
  John Rooney 
  Lawrence Olum
  Matt Luzunaris
  Mechack Jérôme
  C. J. Sapong
  Yann Songo'o

Head coaches
 Adrian Heath (2011–2014)

See also

Other teams have played in the Orlando area in the past:

 Orlando Falcons – 2006–2007 played in Women's Premier Soccer League
 Orlando Lions – 1985–1996 played in American Soccer League and American Professional Soccer League
 Orlando Nighthawks – 1997–1999 played in USL Premier Development League (amateur)
 Orlando Prospects – 2004–2006 played in USL Premier Development League (amateur)
 Orlando Sharks – 2006–2007 played in Major Indoor Soccer League (2001–2008)
 Orlando Sundogs – 1997 played in USL First Division aka A-League

References

External links
Orlando City S.C. Official Website
USL News Release from Orlando Pro Soccer announcement
USL News Release on Orlando City S.C.
Orlando S.C on MLS Team

Association football clubs established in 2010
Soccer clubs in Florida
Soccer clubs in Orlando, Florida
 
2010 establishments in Florida
Former USL Championship teams
Association football clubs disestablished in 2014
2014 disestablishments in Florida